Avenir is a geometric  sans-serif typeface designed by Adrian Frutiger in 1987 and released in 1988 by Linotype GmbH.

The word avenir is French for "future". As the name suggests, the family takes inspiration from the geometric style of sans-serif typeface developed in the 1920s that took the circle as a basis, such as Erbar and Futura. Frutiger intended Avenir to be a more organic interpretation of the geometric style, more even in colour and suitable for extended text, with details recalling more traditional typefaces such as the two-storey 'a' and 't' with a curl at the bottom, and letters such as the 'o' that are not exact, perfect circles but optically corrected.

Frutiger described Avenir as his finest work: "The quality of the draftsmanship – rather than the intellectual idea behind it – is my masterpiece. (...) It was the hardest typeface I have worked on in my life. Working on it, I always had human nature in mind. And what's crucial is that I developed the typeface alone, in peace and quiet – no drafting assistants, no-one was there. My personality is stamped upon it. I'm proud that I was able to create Avenir."

Releases
Avenir was originally released in 1988 with three weights, each with a roman and an oblique version, and used Frutiger's two-digit weight and width convention for names: 45 (book), 46 (book oblique), 55 (text weight), 56 (text weight oblique), (75)85 (heavy), and (76)86 (heavy oblique). The typeface family was later expanded to six weights, each with a roman and an oblique version.

The original release of Avenir has weights grouped very close together, with the difference barely distinguishable. In his autobiography, Frutiger explains that this was a response to the effects of how people perceive colour. He intended the slightly bolder designs for white-on-black text, so they would look the same to a viewer as black-on-white.

Avenir Next
Between 2004 and 2007, together with Linotype's in-house type designer Akira Kobayashi, Frutiger reworked the Avenir family to expand the range of weights and features. The result was titled Avenir Next.

The initial release of the typeface family was increased to 24 fonts: six weights, each with a roman and italic version, in two widths (normal and condensed). Frutiger's numbering system was abandoned in favor of more conventional weight names. The glyph set was expanded to include small caps, text figures, subscript and superscripts, and ligatures.

Two extra font weights (light and thin) were added to the font for the release of Avenir Next W1G, for a total of 32 fonts. This release also added Greek and Cyrillic glyphs in the regular width only.

The current set of weights is therefore ultra light, thin, light, regular, medium, demi bold, bold and heavy, in four styles each (two widths and italics for each width).

From 2012 onwards, Avenir achieved increased visibility through becoming bundled with iOS and macOS (from the Mountain Lion release onwards) as a system font in several weights of both Avenir and Avenir Next.

Janna

Janna is an Arabic variant designed by Nadine Chahine, based on the original Avenir. Janna, which means "heaven" in Arabic, was first designed in 2004 as a signage face for the American University of Beirut. The Arabic glyphs are based on the previously released Frutiger Arabic, but were made more angular.

Two roman fonts, in regular and bold weights, were produced. The typeface supports ISO Adobe 2, Latin Extended, Arabic, Persian, and Urdu characters, and tabular numerals for the supported languages.

Avenir Next Rounded (2012)
Avenir Next Rounded is a version of Avenir Next with rounded terminals, designed by Akira Kobayashi and Sandra Winter.

The family includes 8 fonts in 4 weights (regular, medium, demi, and bold) and 1 width (based on normal width), with complementary italics. OpenType features include numerator and denominator, fractions, standard ligatures, lining and old-style figures, localized forms, scientific inferiors, subscript and superscript, and small caps.

Gallery

Usage

 Capgemini Engineering uses the Avenir font in its website.
 The city of Amsterdam uses Avenir as the principal typeface in its visual identity. The font was chosen when design bureau Eden Design & Communication won a citywide competition. Eden contracted Thonik for the new design.
 In 2008, Wake Forest University adopted Avenir as its primary sans-serif typeface.
The State University of New York, Plattsburgh uses Avenir as the main font in their branding guidelines.
The University of North Alabama uses Avenir as its sans-serif font for text and captions.
 Avenir was formerly used by the Eurovision Song Contest in all its brand communication materials and was used between 2014 and 2018 for the scoreboards of the Junior Eurovision Song Contest.
 A modified version of Avenir Next was created for Best Buy. This version, called "Avenir Next for Best Buy", is used in most Best Buy advertising and promotional material; the collection consists of 12 weights.
 CBS This Morning, a morning show uses the font from 2012 to 2021.
 Apple used Avenir for its Maps app and some Siri screens in iOS 6. OS X Mountain Lion and iWork for iCloud also come pre-loaded with various weights of Avenir and Avenir Next.
 François Hollande used Avenir on his campaign materials during the 2012 French presidential election.
 French railway company SNCF uses Avenir for communication and advertising.
 Since early 2016 Snapchat has used Avenir as the app's main font.
The Co-operative Group uses Avenir.
Bloomberg uses a custom-made package of Avenir Next specifically produced by Linotype as their corporate typeface.
Method Products uses Avenir as the font on all product packaging.
 The Consumer Financial Protection Bureau uses Avenir Next as its primary brand typeface across all print and digital formats.
State of the Nation logo since 2019 used this font.
The music technology company Ableton use the font as part of their branding and as the main font in their flagship software product, Live.
Disney+ uses Avenir extensively as the subscription VOD streaming service's main typeface alongside FF Real Text.
 The National Geospatial-Intelligence Agency uses Avenir as the primary typeface for the U.S. Department of Defense Flight Information Publication (DoD FLIP).
 The Japanese automaker Toyota uses Avenir as its brand caption.
 Land Rover uses the Avenir font in its website.

References

Blackwell, Lewis. 20th Century Type. Yale University Press: 2004. .
Fiedl, Frederich, Nicholas Ott and Bernard Stein. Typography: An Encyclopedic Survey of Type Design and Techniques Through History. Black Dog & Leventhal: 1998. .
Macmillan, Neil. An A–Z of Type Designers. Yale University Press: 2006. .

External links 

Linotype typefaces
Geometric sans-serif typefaces
Typefaces and fonts introduced in 1988
Typefaces designed by Adrian Frutiger